Zarnish Khan is a Pakistani television actress. She is known for her appearance in Urdu television serials. Khan has played a role of Alizeh in Susraal Mera (2015) for which she received Hum Award for Best Soap Actress. Later she played a role of Samra in Aye Zindagi (2015) and Iqra in Sehra Main Safar (2015). The former of which earned her nomination for Best Supporting Actress at Hum Awards. She further appeared in a leading roles in acclaim serials Laaj (2016), Sun Yaara,  Man Chahi (2017), De Ijazat (2018) and Ek Mohabbat Kaafi Hai (2018–19).

Television

Telefilm

Awards and nominations

References

External links 

Living people
Actresses from Karachi
Pakistani television actresses
21st-century Pakistani actresses
1993 births